Hydrocarbon Development Institute of Pakistan,  (HDIP), is based in Islamabad, Pakistan. The HDIP was established in 1975 by the Ministry of Petroleum and Natural Resources. HDIP works closely with the Ministry of Petroleum and Natural Resources. The Petroleum Institute of Pakistan (PIP) The PIP was established in 1963 to represents all the segments of the gas, oil and petroleum industry in Pakistan.

See also

 Petroleum Institute of Pakistan
 Ministry of Petroleum and Natural Resources
 Oil and Gas Development Company

References

Energy in Pakistan
Energy companies established in 1975
Non-renewable resource companies established in 1975
1975 establishments in Pakistan